John Carlos Cortez (born March 9, 2004) is an American soccer player who plays as a defender for USL Championship side New York Red Bulls II via the New York Red Bulls academy.

Club career
As part of the New York Red Bulls academy, Cortez appeared for New York Red Bulls II in June 2021, originally debuting on June 12, 2021, against Charleston Battery, but the game was abandoned due to bad weather. He made official debut on June 16, 2021, appearing as an 86th-minute substitute during a 3–1 win over Charlotte Independence.

Career statistics

Club

References

2004 births
Living people
American soccer players
Association football defenders
New York Red Bulls II players
People from Ridgewood, New Jersey
Soccer players from New Jersey
Sportspeople from Bergen County, New Jersey
USL Championship players